Tetraena is a genus of flowering plants in the family Zygophyllaceae.

Description
The leaves are opposite, or sometimes borne on short shoots and then appearing to be alternate. They may or may not have stalks (petioles). The flower usually has five petals and five sepals, rarely four, and ten stamens. The flower is usually tube-like in appearance with white to pale orange petals. The ovary has three to five chambers (locules). The ripe fruit is variable in shape, splitting into parts before releasing the seeds.

Taxonomy
The genus Tetraena was erected by Karl Maximovich in 1889 for the species Tetraena mongolica. Until 2003, this was the only species recognized in the genus. Molecular phylogenetic studies suggested that the genus Zygophyllum was not monophyletic, since Tetraena and some other genera were nested within it. To create monophyletic genera, Björn-Axel Beier and Mats Thulin transferred about 40 species of Zygophyllum to Tetraena, creating a much expanded genus, though IPNI still treats it as a synonym of Zygophyllum.

Species
, Plants of the World Online accepted the following species:

Tetraena aegyptia (Hosny) Beier & Thulin
Tetraena alba (L.f.) Beier & Thulin
Tetraena applanata (Van Zyl) Beier & Thulin
Tetraena bucharica (B.Fedtsch.) Beier & Thulin
Tetraena chrysopteros (Retief) Beier & Thulin
Tetraena clavata (Schltr. & Diels) Beier & Thulin
Tetraena coccinea (L.) Beier & Thulin
Tetraena cornuta (Coss.) Beier & Thulin
Tetraena cylindrifolia (Schinz) Beier & Thulin
Tetraena decumbens (Delile) Beier & Thulin
Tetraena dumosa (Boiss.) Beier & Thulin
Tetraena fontanesii (Webb & Berthel.) Beier & Thulin
Tetraena gaetula (Emb. & Maire) Beier & Thulin
Tetraena geslinii (Coss.) Beier & Thulin
Tetraena giessii (Merxm. & A.Schreib.) Beier & Thulin
Tetraena hamiensis (Schweinf.) Beier & Thulin
Tetraena longicapsularis (Schinz) Beier & Thulin
Tetraena longistipulata (Schinz) Beier & Thulin
Tetraena madagascariensis (Baill.) Beier & Thulin
Tetraena madecassa (H.Perrier) Beier & Thulin
Tetraena mandavillei (Hadidi) Beier & Thulin
Tetraena microcarpa (Licht. ex Cham.) Beier & Thulin
Tetraena migiurtinorum (Chiov.) Beier & Thulin
Tetraena mongolica Maxim.
Tetraena prismatica (Chiov.) Beier & Thulin
Tetraena prismatocarpa (Sond.) Beier & Thulin
Tetraena propinqua (Decne.) Ghaz. & Osborne
Tetraena pterocaulis (Van Zyl) Beier & Thulin
Tetraena qatarensis (Hadidi) Beier & Thulin
Tetraena retrofracta (Thunb.) Beier & Thulin
Tetraena rigida (Schinz) Beier & Thulin
Tetraena simplex (L.) Beier & Thulin
Tetraena somalensis (Hadidi) Beier & Thulin
Tetraena stapfii (Schinz) Beier & Thulin
Tetraena tenuis (R.Glover) Beier & Thulin

Distribution
Tetraena is native from the Canary Islands in the west and South Africa in the south to China in the east.

References

Zygophylloideae
Rosid genera